NFT may refer to a non-fungible token, a unit of data on a digital ledger called a blockchain.

NFT may also refer to:

 Nft (software), a command in the nftables subsystem of the Linux kernel
 NFT Ventures, Inc., a family trust established by U.S. computer businessman Ray Noorda
 National Film Theatre (now BFI Southbank), a leading repertory theatre in London
 Neurofibrillary tangle, aggregates of hyperphosphorylated tau protein
 Not for Tourists, a series of guides to major cities
 Nutrient film technique, a hydroponic technique
 NFT, a timezone for the Norfolk Island external territory of Australia

See also
 NTFS, a file system developed by Microsoft